Holbrook is a hamlet and census-designated place (CDP) in Suffolk County, New York, United States. The population was 27,195 at the 2010 census.  The community borders  the eastern side of Long Island MacArthur Airport.

History
Holbrook is believed to have derived its name from a stream which was called, in various narratives,  either "Old Brook" or "Hollow Brook."

The area was part of the 51,000 acre Islip Grange estate, acquired in 1697 by William Nicoll (son of Matthias Nicoll, who was the sixth mayor of New York City).  It was largely a rural area until Alexander McCotter acquired 5,000 acres in the area in 1848 (after the Long Island Rail Road reached it in 1844) and platted the community. The oldest still standing building from this period is St. John's Lutheran Church, which was built in 1863. In 1875, the Nevins and Griswold cigar factory operated at the original LIRR station.

In 1931, the population was 321. Population increased from 2,500 in 1965 to 15,000 in 1975,  after the Long Island Expressway reached the community in 1969. It also was the center of growth as Long Island MacArthur Airport developed along the community's western border.

Geography

Climate 
It has a hot-summer humid continental climate (Dfa) and average monthly temperatures at the Holbrook Country Club range from 30.9 °F in January to 74.0 °F in July. The local hardiness zone is 7a.

Demographics

As of the census of 2000, there were 27,512 people, 9,019 households, and 7,350 families residing in the CDP. The population density was 4,032.5 per square mile (1,557.5/km2). There were 9,157 housing units at an average density of 1,342.2/sq mi (518.4/km2). The racial makeup of the CDP was 89.1% White, 1.32% African American, 0.08% Native American, 2.87% Asian, 0.04% Pacific Islander, 0.69% from other races, and 1.05% from two or more races. Hispanic or Latino of any race were 5.9% of the population.

There were 9,019 households, out of which 39.1% had children under the age of 18 living with them, 68.8% were married couples living together, 9.5% had a female householder with no husband present, and 18.5% were non-families. 14.3% of all households were made up of individuals, and 3.9% had someone living alone who was 65 years of age or older. The average household size was 3.04 and the average family size was 3.38.

In the CDP, the population was spread out, with 25.7% under the age of 18, 8.0% from 18 to 24, 32.5% from 25 to 44, 26.2% from 45 to 64, and 7.5% who were 65 years of age or older. The median age was 35 years. For every 100 females, there were 94.6 males. For every 100 females age 18 and over, there were 91.8 males.

The median income for a household in the CDP was $72,801, and the median income for a family was $76,349 (these figures had risen to $96,530 and $101,336 respectively as of a 2007 estimate. Males had a median income of $80,040 versus $63,651 for females. The per capita income for the CDP was $26,863. About 2.5% of families and 3.3% of the population were below the poverty threshold, including 3.6% of those under age 18 and 3.8% of those age 65 or over.

Government 
Holbrook is located mainly within the Town of Islip, while the section between Portion Road and the Long Island Rail Road tracks is in the Town of Brookhaven.

Education 
All of Holbrook is within the Sachem Central School District, which is independent of town borders.

The schools located in Holbrook are three of the ten elementary schools: Grundy Elementary, Nokomis Elementary, and Merrimac Elementary, and one of the three middle schools: Seneca Middle School.

Holbrook residents attend either Sachem High School North or Sachem High School East, depending on which section of Holbrook they live in. Residents living in the north and west parts of the hamlet go to Sachem High School North in Lake Ronkonkoma, while those living in the south and east parts of the hamlet go to Sachem High School East in Farmingville.

Sachem Public Library is located in Holbrook.

Transportation

Roads
Roads that pass through Holbrook include:
 I-495 (Long Island Expressway}: access from Exit 61.
 New York State Route 454, known as Suffolk County Veterans' Memorial Highway
 New York State Route 27, known as Sunrise POW/MIA Highway, forming the southern border of the CDP. Access from Exit 50 eastbound, exit 51 westbound.
 CR-19, known as Patchogue-Holbrook Road
 CR-18, known as Broadway Avenue (unsigned)
 CR-19A, known as Main Street (unsigned)
 CR-97, known as Nicolls Road, forming part of the eastern border of the CDP
 CR-16, known as Portion Road, forming the northern border of the CDP
Lincoln Avenue, near the western border of the CDP

Buses
Bus service in Holbrook is provided by Suffolk County Transit.

Train
Holbrook is accessible on the Ronkonkoma Branch of the Long Island Rail Road. The Holbrook station closed in 1962, so the nearest access to the line is at the Ronkonkoma station or Medford station.

Airport

Health care

References

Islip (town), New York
Brookhaven, New York
Hamlets in New York (state)
Census-designated places in New York (state)
Census-designated places in Suffolk County, New York
Hamlets in Suffolk County, New York